Franklin-Gordon Wild Rivers is a national park in Tasmania, 117 km west of Hobart. It is named after the two main river systems lying within the bounds of the park - the Franklin River and the Gordon River.

Location 
The Franklin-Gordon Wild Rivers National Park lies between the Central Highlands and West Coast Range of Tasmania in the heart of the Tasmanian Wilderness World Heritage Area.

It is bisected by the only road to pass through this area - the Lyell Highway.

History 
The genesis of the Wild Rivers National Park was in the earlier Frenchmans Cap National Park which had the Franklin River as its boundary on the northern and western borders. Frenchmans Cap is a dominant feature in the region, and can be seen on the skyline from the west and north of the park.

The Gordon and Franklin Rivers were the subject of one of Australia's largest conservation efforts. The Franklin Dam was part of a proposed hydro-electric power scheme that had been in the plans of The Hydro for some time. The enthusiastic endorsement by Robin Gray's Liberal Government would have seen the river flooded. It became a national issue for the Tasmanian Wilderness Society, led by its director at the time, Bob Brown.

Despite being given heritage status, the catchments and rivers remain at risk.

Access points
The Lyell Highway winds for 56 kilometres through the heart of the Franklin-Gordon Wild Rivers National Park.

See also

 Commonwealth v Tasmania
 Darwin Crater - a suspected meteorite impact crater located within the park
 Protected areas of Tasmania
 List of national parks of Australia

References

External links
 
 Position in World Heritage Area

 
National parks of Tasmania
Protected areas established in 1908
Wilderness areas of Tasmania
1908 establishments in Australia
Gordon River, Tasmania
Tasmanian Wilderness World Heritage Area
Franklin River, Tasmania